Mohan Lal Jhikram (1 August 1919, in Dindori in Mandla district (Madhya Pradesh) – 6 June 2010) was a leader of Indian National Congress from Madhya Pradesh. He served as member of the Lok Sabha representing Mandla (Lok Sabha constituency). He was elected to 8th, 9th and 10th Lok Sabha.

References

India MPs 1991–1996
People from Mandla district
1919 births
2010 deaths
India MPs 1989–1991
India MPs 1984–1989
Lok Sabha members from Madhya Pradesh
People from Dindori district
Madhya Pradesh MLAs 1980–1985
Indian National Congress politicians from Madhya Pradesh